Snelling & Randolph is a bus rapid transit station on the Metro A Line in Saint Paul, Minnesota.

The station is located at the intersection of Randolph Avenue on Snelling Avenue. Both station platforms are located far-side of Randolph Avenue.

The station opened June 11, 2016 with the rest of the A Line.

Bus connections
 Route 74 - 46th Street Station - Randolph Avenue - West 7th Street - East 7th Street - Sunray Transit Center
 Route 84 - Snelling Avenue - Highland Village - Sibley Plaza
Connections to local bus Route 74 can be made on Randolph Avenue. Route 84 shares platforms with the A Line.

Notable places nearby
Highland Park, Saint Paul
Macalester-Groveland, Saint Paul

References

External links 
 Metro Transit: Snelling & Randolph Station

Bus stations in Minnesota
2016 establishments in Minnesota